Howardstown, Kentucky is an unincorporated community located on the Rolling Fork River in the southern portion of Nelson County, Kentucky, United States.

A post office was established in Howardstown in 1893, and named for the local Howard family. A member of that family, William Howard, had first settled the area c. 1811.

Notes

Unincorporated communities in Nelson County, Kentucky
Unincorporated communities in Kentucky